The Metropolitan Golf Club is one of the renowned sandbelt courses of Melbourne and is widely recognised as one of the finest championship courses in Australia. It is located in Oakleigh South, in the city's south-eastern suburbs, approximately twenty minutes' drive from the CBD.

History
Metropolitan Golf Club shares its origins with Royal Melbourne Golf Club, which was founded in 1891 as Melbourne Golf Club, with the Royal title being granted in 1895. When the original course at Caulfield was turned over to housing, Royal Melbourne moved to a new course at Sandringham. Members who remained formed the Caulfield Golf Club, and in 1906 purchased a farm in Oakleigh with a two-storey house. In 1908 they moved to the new course, designed by club member J B MacKenzie, renaming their club as The Metropolitan Golf Club. In 1960, several holes were lost in order to build a school, with replacement holes designed by Dick Wilson being built on adjacent land.

Course
Metropolitan enjoys a reputation as one of the best conditioned year-round courses in Australia. Prior to the 1997 Australian Open, Greg Norman described Metropolitan's pure couch grass fairways as the best he had played on anywhere in the world. During the 2001 WGC-Accenture Match Play Championship, a number of the world's top-ranked players compared the condition of the course to Augusta National. The bentgrass greens are large, firm and fast and are hand-mown right to the edge of the greenside bunkers. In total, there are 103 bunkers on the course and almost every hole is flanked by huge stands of Australian native trees which provide sanctuary to many species of native birds, including the noisy but beautiful sulphur-crested cockatoo and the multi-coloured rainbow lorikeet.

Tournament history
The Metropolitan hosted the Kirk-Windeyer Cup in 1929, the Australian Open in 1930, and the Melbourne Centenary Open in 1934. The Australian Open returned in 1934 when it was won by Gene Sarazen, and again in 1951, when Peter Thomson was victorious.

In 1968, Metropolitan hosted the Australian PGA Championship; the tournament was won by Kel Nagle, who defeated a strong field that included Arnold Palmer, Jack Nicklaus and Gary Player. In 1979, Jack Newton won the Australian Open at Metropolitan by one stroke from a young Greg Norman, who three-putted the final green. The Australian Open returned in 1986, with Rodger Davis celebrating a popular win, in 1993, when American Brad Faxon triumphed with a four-round score of 275 (13 under par), and in 1997, when English Ryder Cup star Lee Westwood defeated Norman on the fourth hole of a sudden-death playoff after Norman once again three-putted the final green.

In addition to the Australian Open (7 times) and the Australian PGA Championship (5 times), Metropolitan has hosted many other elite professional and amateur tournaments, including the Australian Amateur (5 times) and the Victorian Open, for which it was the regular venue in the early 1980s.

Metropolitan celebrated its centenary year in 2001 and hosted the 2001 WGC-Accenture Match Play Championship in the first week of January. Sixty-four of the highest ranked golfers in the world competed in elimination format for US$5 million and the Walter Hagen Cup, on the course Hagen described in 1930 as "by far the finest course I have played in Australia". Pre-tournament favorite and world number 2 Ernie Els was knocked out in the semi-final by little known Swede Pierre Fulke, who couldn't repeat his effort in the 36-hole final the next day in losing to American Steve Stricker 2 & 1.

In February 2009, Metropolitan hosted the Women's Australian Open, which marked 100 years of play on the course at Oakleigh. The event was won by England's Laura Davies

Metropolitan hosted the World Cup in November 2018.

References

External links

Golf clubs and courses in Victoria (Australia)
Sport in the City of Monash
Sporting clubs in Melbourne
1908 establishments in Australia
Sports clubs established in 1908
Buildings and structures in the City of Monash